Me Siento Solo (Eng.: "I Feel Lonely") is the third studio album released by Los Bukis in 1978.

Track listing 
All songs were written and composed by Marco Antonio Solís, except for La Indiecita.

References

1978 albums
Los Bukis albums